The Delran Township School District is a comprehensive community public school district that serves students in pre-kindergarten through twelfth grade from Delran Township, in Burlington County, New Jersey, United States.

As of the 2020–21 school year, the district, comprised of four schools, had an enrollment of 2,970 students and 242.6 classroom teachers (on an FTE basis), for a student–teacher ratio of 12.2:1.

The district is classified by the New Jersey Department of Education as being in District Factor Group "FG", the fourth-highest of eight groupings. District Factor Groups organize districts statewide to allow comparison by common socioeconomic characteristics of the local districts. From lowest socioeconomic status to highest, the categories are A, B, CD, DE, FG, GH, I and J.

History
Into the early 1970s, students from Delran Township and Delanco Township attended Riverside High School as part of sending/receiving relationships with the Riverside School District. Efforts to merge the three districts into a combined regional K-12 system were rejected in a November 1971 referendum, leading the Delran district to pursue efforts to create its own high school. The Delran sending relationship began in 1954. Delran High School, constructed at a cost of $6 million (equivalent to $ million in ), opened for the 1975-76 school year.

Schools
Schools in the district (with 2020–21 enrollment data from the National Center for Education Statistics) are:

Elementary schools
Millbridge Elementary School with 653 students in grades PreK-2
Jennifer Lowe, Principal
Delran Intermediate School with 617 students in grades 3-5
Kimberly Clark-Hickson, Principal
Middle school
Delran Middle School with 707 students in grades 6-8
Michael McHale, Principal
High school
Delran High School with 938 students in grades 9-12
Daniel S. Finkle, Principal

Administration
Core members of the district's administration are:
Brian Brotschul, Superintendent
Cande Kristoff, Business Administrator / Board Secretary

Board of education
The district's board of education is comprised of nine members who set policy and oversee the fiscal and educational operation of the district through its administration. As a Type II school district, the board's trustees are elected directly by voters to serve three-year terms of office on a staggered basis, with three seats up for election each year held (since 2012) as part of the November general election. The board appoints a superintendent to oversee the district's day-to-day operations and a business administrator to supervise the business functions of the district.

References

External links
Delran Township School District
 
School Data for the Delran Township School District, National Center for Education Statistics

Delran Township, New Jersey
New Jersey District Factor Group FG
School districts in Burlington County, New Jersey